Jonathan Wilkinson  (born June 11, 1965) is a Canadian politician who has served as the minister of natural resources since 2021. A member of the Liberal Party, Wilkinson was elected as the member of Parliament (MP) for North Vancouver in 2015. He previously served as the minister of fisheries, oceans, and the Canadian Coast Guard from 2018 to 2019 and minister of environment and climate change from 2019 to 2021. Before entering politics, Wilkinson was a constitutional negotiator and businessman who spent 20 years in the private sector, mainly with green technology companies.

Early life and education
Wilkinson was born in Sault Ste. Marie, Ontario and grew up in Saskatoon. He was the former leader of the New Democratic Party's youth wing in Saskatchewan.

Wilkinson earned a bachelor's degree from the University of Saskatchewan and went on to be named the Prairies Rhodes Scholar in 1988, reading Politics, Philosophy, and Economics at Exeter College, Oxford. He earned master's degrees in international relations, politics, and economics from Oxford and McGill.

Career 
Wilkinson was an advisor to Saskatchewan Premier Roy Romanow and served in the provincial civil service from 1991 to 1995, when he joined Bain & Company's Toronto branch. In 1999, he relocated to Vancouver to work for QuestAir Technologies, a gas purification company and he became its CEO in 2002. In 2009, he became the senior vice-president for business development in Nexterra Systems, a biomass company. In 2011, Wilkinson became the CEO of BioteQ Environmental Technologies, a water treatment company based in Vancouver.

Political career 
Wilkinson defeated Conservative parliamentary secretary Andrew Saxton by a nearly 2-to-1 margin amid the Liberal wave that swept through Greater Vancouver in the 2015 federal election. North Vancouver and its predecessor, North Vancouver—Burnaby, had been in the hands of a centre-right party for all but four years since 1979. He was reelected in 2019 by a reduced margin, but still bested Saxton by 16 percentage points in a rematch.

On November 20, 2019, Wilkinson was appointed Minister of Environment and Climate Change in the 29th Canadian Ministry.

Electoral record

External links
 Official Website
 Bio & mandate from the Prime Minister

References

1965 births
Living people
Members of the 29th Canadian Ministry
Members of the House of Commons of Canada from British Columbia
Members of the King's Privy Council for Canada
Liberal Party of Canada MPs
Businesspeople from Ontario
Businesspeople from British Columbia
People from Sault Ste. Marie, Ontario
People from North Vancouver
Canadian management consultants
Canadian Rhodes Scholars
University of Saskatchewan alumni
Alumni of Exeter College, Oxford
McGill University alumni
21st-century Canadian politicians
Canadian Ministers of the Environment